There are at least two places Garden Cove may refer to;

Garden Cove, Newfoundland and Labrador
Garden Cove, Florida, an unincorporated community on the island of Key largo, Monroe County, Florida, United States.